Haze are an English progressive rock band from Sheffield, mainly active in England in the 1980s.

History 
Formed in 1978 by the brothers Chris McMahon (bass, keyboards and vocals), and Paul McMahon (guitar and vocals), they played their first concert at Stephen Hill Youth Club, Sheffield on 10 November that year. They had several drummers before the longest serving and most notable, Paul 'Chis' Chisnell, joined them at a concert at the White Lion, Huddersfield, on 19 June 1983.

The band's first full album, C'est La Vie, was released on vinyl with a special concert at Sheffield's The Leadmill on 7 April 1984.

Following a "final" sell-out gig at Sheffield University on the 10th anniversary of the band's founding, 29 May 1988, the trio split up, but reunited for a "one-off" concert to mark the 20th anniversary, on 31 May 1998 at The Boardwalk, Sheffield. They now play together on an occasional basis, and played two 30th anniversary gigs at The Peel, Kingston-upon-Thames, London on 31 May, and at The Boardwalk on 1 June 2008, at which six new songs were performed.

Despite achieving no chart success, and never having a recording contract (they released their own albums, on their 'Gabadon' label), they attracted a considerable cult following, headlined at The Marquee,

In March 2013 the band released their first studio album in 26 years, called The Last Battle. The album features the band in its classic line-up (Paul and Chris McMahon and Paul Chisnell) with the addition of Ceri Ashton (on whistle, flute, cello, viola and clarinet) and Catrin Ashton (on fiddle and flute). The band stated that this is the final recorded performance with their long time drummer Paul Chisnell. Since the release of the album Paul McMahon's son Danny McMahon has been playing drums with Haze.

Images 
The band at a concert in the early 1980s

Discography

Singles and EPs 
 "The Night" (1981, 7" single)
 The Ember (12" EP, 1985)
 "Tunnel Vision" / "Shadows" (1986, 7" single)

Albums 
 The Cellar Tapes (1983, C-Cassette)
 C'est La Vie (1984)
 Cellar Replay (1985)
 Warts 'n' All (1986, live album)
 Stoat & Bottle (1987)
 Humphrey (1988)
 The 10th Anniversary Gig
 In Concert
 20th Anniversary Show (1998)
 30th Anniversary Show (2008)
 The Last Battle (2013)
 40th Anniversary Show (2018)
 Back to the bones (2020)

Compilations 
 Old New Burrowed & Blue (No Third Mole) (1986, Compilation)
 The Peterborough Tapes (1987, Compilation)
 Last Orders (1989, Compilation)
 In the End: 1978–88 (1992, Compilation)
 C'est La Vie / The Ember (1996, Compilation)
 20th Anniversary Tape: 1978–98 (1998, Compilation)

Videos 
 In That Branch of the Lake (Lecco 9 April 2010) (2010, Recorded live on their Italian Tour in April 2010)
 40th anniversary show (Sheffield 23 June 2018) (2018, Recorded live at the Greystones, Sheffield 2018)

References

External links 

 
 
 
 
 Haze history & discography at ProgArchives.com
 

Musical groups from Sheffield
English progressive rock groups
New Wave of British Heavy Metal musical groups